Amor y un poco más (English language:Love and A Little More) is a 1968 Argentine film directed by Derlis M. Beccaglia and written by Augusto Giustozzi. Starring Olga Zubarry and Elsa Daniel.

Release
The film premiered in Argentina in May 1968.

Cast
Atilio Marinelli
Elsa Daniel
Gilda Lousek
Fernando Siro
Olga Zubarry
Marcela López Rey
Vicente Rubino
Enzo Viena

External links
http://www.imdb.com/title/tt0318293/

1968 films
1960s Spanish-language films
1968 drama films
Argentine drama films
1960s Argentine films